Plectroglyphidodon sagmarius is a species of Perciformes in the family Pomacentridae.

References 

sagmarius
Animals described in 1999